James Spencer Henry Edmond Marcel Thierrée (born 2 May 1974 in Lausanne, Switzerland) is a Swiss-French circus performer, violinist, actor and director who is best known for his theatre performances which blend contemporary circus, mime, dance, and music. He is the son of circus performers Victoria Chaplin and Jean-Baptiste Thierrée, the grandson of filmmaker Charlie Chaplin and the great-grandson of playwright Eugene O'Neill.

Biography
Thierrée made his stage debut aged four in 1978, appearing alongside his older sister, Aurélia Thierrée, at his parents' small circus, Le Cirque Imaginaire. He toured with the circus and its follower, Le Cirque Invisible, throughout his childhood and teenage years, until 1994. Due to this, he was taught by tutors up to the age of twelve, when he was enrolled at the American School of Paris. Later he studied at the Piccolo Teatro in Milan, the CNSAD and the Acting International in Paris, and the Harvard Theater School in the United States. In 1991, aged fifteen, he made his film debut in the role of Ariel in Peter Greenaway's film Prospero's Books, and has since appeared in several films. He was nominated for the César Award for Most Promising Actor in 2006 for his role in Antoine de Caunes's film Twice upon a Time (2006).

In 1998 Thierrée founded his own theatre company, La Compagnie du Hanneton, and  directed his first stage show, The Junebug Symphony (La Symphonie du Hanneton), in which he also performed. It toured several countries around the world and received favourable reviews from, for example, the New York Times and the Los Angeles Times. Thierrée won four Molière Awards for the show, including that of the best director and the best newcomer in 2006, and it was chosen in 2009 as one of the ten most important theatre pieces of the decade by Le Figaro. His next pieces, the Bright Abyss (2003, La Veillée des Abysses) and Au Revoir Parapluie (2007) were similarly acclaimed, and he was awarded a Molière for the latter.  In 2008 he also received Le Prix Plaisir du Théâtre from the Société des Auteurs et Compositeurs Dramatiques. His fourth stage show, Raoul (2009) received more mixed reviews. Thierrée's fifth spectacle, titled Tabac Rouge, is to premiere in Lausanne in the summer of 2013.

Ancestry

Stage productions

Theatre roles

La Compagnie du Hanneton

Filmography

References

External links
Official website of La Compagnie du Hanneton 

Living people
Best Supporting Actor César Award winners
1974 births
French male film actors
French male child actors
French male stage actors
French film directors
French people of American descent
French people of British descent
French people of Irish descent
French people of English descent
Chaplin family
Modern dancers
Acrobats
French circus performers
Swiss circus performers
French National Academy of Dramatic Arts alumni